Gary Edward Gresdal (January 15, 1947 – March 13, 2022) was a Canadian professional ice hockey centre. He played two regular-season World Hockey Association games and one playoff game with the Quebec Nordiques in the 1975–76 season, recording one assist and five penalty minutes in the regular season and 14 penalty minutes in the playoffs. Gresdal died on March 13, 2022, at the age of 75.

References

External links

1947 births
2022 deaths
Albuquerque Six-Guns players
Canadian expatriate ice hockey players in the United States
Canadian ice hockey centres
Denver Spurs (WHL) players
Des Moines Oak Leafs players
Ice hockey people from Ontario
Jersey Devils players
Maine Nordiques players
Quebec Nordiques (WHA) players
Regina Pats players
Sportspeople from Kingston, Ontario
Syracuse Blazers players
Syracuse Eagles players